Paul Twible (born 14 December 1957) is an Australian cricketer. He played in five first-class and four List A matches for Queensland between 1982 and 1987.

See also
 List of Queensland first-class cricketers

References

External links
 

1957 births
Living people
Australian cricketers
Queensland cricketers
Cricketers from Brisbane